The European Prize for Architecture is an architecture prize awarded annually by the European Centre for Architecture Art Design and Urban Studies and Chicago Athenaeum: Museum of Architecture. It was established by Christian Narkiewicz-Laine, the Finnish-Lithuanian-American architect, design critic, artist, poet, and museum chief of the Chicago Athenaeum.
 
The Prize, according to Narkiewicz-Laine, "was established to continue and celebrate Europe’s ongoing contribution to world history and culture and to encourage our present generation of practitioners to embrace the true art of architecture together with its humanistic and social pursuits in order to make our European cities and nations true centers of advanced culture and civilization." "Throughout the centuries", Mr. Narkiewicz-Laine adds, "Europe has given the world its most important practitioners from Phidias, Vitriuvius, Michelangelo, da Vinci, and Palladio to the early modern masters, Le Corbusier, Alvar Aalto, Walter Gropius, and Eliel and Eero Saarinen. Those architects have developed numerous philosophies and visionary approaches to building, engineering, and planning that have grown from the need to invent or express a time and place in Europe’s rich history. Classicism, Byzantine, Gothic, Renaissance, Baroque, Beaux-Arts, Constructivism, Art Deco, DeStijl, and Modernism have all resulted as an expression of clearly stated European values and ideals and have given form and shape to the most famous cities in the world."

Recipients

Host cities
Each year's results are announced during a ceremony that is hosted in a different European or South or North American city each time. So far, the European Prize for Architecture ceremonies (and accompanying events) have been hosted by:

See also
Good Design
List of architecture prizes

References

External links
Official website
The Chicago Athenaeum Museum of Architecture and Design 
The European Centre for Architecture Art Design and Urban Studies

Architecture awards
Awards established in 2010